Afer echinatus is a species of large sea snail, marine gastropod mollusc in the family Buccinidae.

Description

Distribution

References

 Fraussen K. (2008). The genus Afer Conrad, 1858 (Gastropoda: Buccinidae), with descriptions of a new subgenus and a new species from western Africa. Novapex 9(1): 41-48

External links

echinatus
Gastropods described in 2008